Judy Carmichael (born November 27, 1957) is a Grammy-nominated jazz pianist and vocalist who has been honored as a Steinway Artist.

Stride Piano
Carmichael specialises in a form of early jazz called stride piano, which is a physical style of playing associated with James P. Johnson. Willie "The Lion" Smith. Count Basie was so taken with Carmichael's playing that he gave her the nickname "Stride". With stride piano, the pianist alternates low bass notes on beats one and three with chords on beats two and four with their left hand, while playing figures and improvised lines with their right. "What made me unusual when I started doing that was that all the people playing stride were big men, and I was a surfer girl from California," she told The New York Times.

Reviewing her first album Two-Handed Stride, recorded in 1980, Scott Yanow wrote: "The recording debut of pianist Judy Carmichael was a major, if somewhat unheralded event. The first important stride pianist to emerge in nearly 30 years, Carmichael has proved to be a consistently creative and exciting performer (rather than imitative) within the genre of classic jazz and swing during the years since her debut. For this set (originally out on Progressive and reissued on CD) Carmichael is joined by altoist Marshall Royal, guitarist Freddie Green, bassist Red Callender, and drummer Harold Jones which gives some of the music a Count Basie feel. However, Carmichael's own musical personality was already nearly fully formed by the date. Highlights of the joyous music include "Christopher Columbus", "Honeysuckle Rose", "A Handful of Keys" and "I Would Do Anything for You."

Radio and TV
Carmichael has been a guest performer on Garrison Keillor's A Prairie Home Companion, and radio broadcasts on NPR's Morning Edition. She primarily appears on radio as the host of Public Radio's Judy Carmichael's Jazz Inspired, a radio program that interviews creative people from all walks of life who talk about their creative process, and how their interest in jazz has affected that process.

On television, she has appeared on Entertainment Tonight and CBS Sunday Morning, both with host Charles Kuralt and with Charles Osgood.

Her show appears on American public radio, as well as Sirius/XM's NPR Now channel. She also writes articles for JazzTimes. She produced and hosted a fifteen-part series for public radio: Pet Style Radio with Judy Carmichael.

Carmichael is the nationally syndicated host of Judy Carmichael's Jazz Inspired, a National Public Radio show and Sirius/XM show and podcast that debuted in 1993 and broadcasts on over 170 stations throughout North America. It is also broadcast on Sirius XM Satellite Radio's NPR NOW Channel and abroad. The show celebrated its 20th anniversary in 2013. She has interviewed numerous celebrities, including an interview with Raiders of the Lost Ark actress Karen Allen, actor Chevy Chase, singer Tony Bennett, rock pianist Billy Joel, actors John Lithgow, Robert Redford, F. Murray Abraham, and others.

Biography

Early life
Carmichael was born Judith Lea Hohenstein in suburban Southern California on November 27, 1957. She was taught piano by her mother beginning around age 4 and continued with two years of formal piano training. Her first public performance on piano, when she was 17, was at UCLA's Royce Hall, sharing billing with Edgar Bergen, Jo Stafford and Paul Weston. Shortly afterwards, she shared a bill with Eubie Blake at a performance for the Los Angeles ragtime association, The Maple Leaf Club.

Carmichael has said her love of ragtime began when her grandfather offered $50 to his first grandchild who could play "Maple Leaf Rag".

Professional career
Carmichael attended California State University, Fullerton as a German Major and later Cal State Long Beach as a Communications Major. She continued as a professional ragtime pianist in her early 20s, eventually shifting to jazz. She performed ragtime and stride at Disneyland for five years.

There she met trumpeter Jackie Coon, a Los Angeles studio musician who encouraged her and then pointed Basie drummer Harold Jones her way when Jones was substituting at Disneyland. Through Jones, she met guitarist Freddie Green and vocalist Sarah Vaughan. She joined their golf foursome, and all of them, Vaughan in particular, encouraged her to make a record.

While seeking a recording session with a label in New York City, Carmichael sat in at a Roy Eldridge concert at his request. After hearing her play, Eldridge recommended her to Dick Wellstood and to Tommy Flanagan so they could hear her play. Eldridge remained a supporter of Carmichael, periodically sending her music he wanted her to play.

Carmichael lived in New York and California in the early 1980s, keeping the Disney gig and working L.A. and Manhattan clubs and European festivals, eventually moving to New York full-time in 1985.

Carmichael tried to break into the jazz scene in Los Angeles, but most of the jazz clubs she found were male-dominated, intimidating, and unsafe to be a female musician. Carmichael was the first female instrumentalist to be hired by Disneyland (and shared a dressing room with 10 men). No other female instrumentalist was hired during Carmichael's five years at Disney, and she was always the only woman instrumentalist at jazz festivals. She finally shared the stage with Marian McPartland on McPartland's Piano Jazz in 1988.

Festivals and concerts
Carmichael has played major festivals and concert halls internationally. She has toured for United States State Department in Australia, India, Portugal, Brazil, Morocco and Singapore. In 1992, she was the first jazz musician sponsored by the United States Government tour to China.

Her performances include Carnegie Hall, Jazz Festival 2008 Brazil, Jazz at Lincoln Center's Fats Waller Festival Peggy Guggenheim Museum, Tanglewood Jazz Festival, and 92d Street Y's Jazz in July.

She made her debut as a vocalist on September 10, 1996, at the Tavern on the Green restaurant in New York City with Steve Ross.

Carmichael, particularly as ambassador and revivalist of a form of jazz that peaked many decades ago, is known for being one of the most accessible jazz pianists in the business.

Recording
In 1980, Carmichael made her recording debut on Progressive and has gone on to record 13 albums to date.  Two have been for larger labels. The majority are released on her label, C&D Productions. Her debut album, Two Handed Stride was recorded with Basie sidemen Marshal Royal, Freddie Green, Red Callender, and Harold Jones, and was nominated for a Grammy Award.  The compilation of this album and her second, Jazz Piano, were rereleased on a CD compilation on C&D Productions label. Her album Southern Swing (2008) was recorded live at the Wangaratta Festival of Jazz.[18] Her first all vocal CD I Love Being Here With You, released in 2013, was the first where she ceded piano duties to someone else, in this case Mike Renzi (formerly music director for Peggy Lee, Mel Tormé, Tony Bennett and Sesame Street).  Carmichael followed with her first CD of originals (music Harry Allen, lyrics Judy Carmichael) Can You Love Once More? Judy & Harry play Carmichael & Allen.

Other work
She has given private recitals for Rod Stewart, Robert Redford, President Bill Clinton, and Gianni Agnelli. She has appeared with Joel Grey, Michael Feinstein, Dick Hyman, Marcus Roberts, Steve Ross, and the Smothers Brothers.

At her first major European jazz festival in Nice, France, she did two piano concerts with John Lewis, Francois Rilhac and Joe Bushkin. Carmichael has served on a variety of music panels at the NEA. She has spoken before the National Council on the Arts and she has been an advocate for fellowship grants for individual performers.[3] She oversaw music education activities for the Port Jeff Education and Arts Conservancy, a community center in Port Jefferson, New York, near her home of Sag Harbor. In 2000 Carmichael created her own radio show/podcast, Judy Carmichael's Jazz Inspired, which she continues to host and produce. She interviews celebrated artists about their love for jazz and how it inspires them.  The show, now in its 17th year is carried on NPR and SiriusXm.

Awards and honors
Carmichael received several grants from the National Endowment for the Arts (NEA). With them, her noteworthy projects include a documentary of early jazz musicians, and a project to discuss with college students nationwide the history and development of jazz piano.

Her album Two Handed Stride was nominated for a Grammy Award.

Discography

Main source:

Books
 You Can Play Authentic Stride Piano
 Introduction to Stride Piano

Her arrangement of "Ain't Misbehavin'" appears in an anthology of jazz standards:
 Steinway & Sons Vol. 4: Piano Stylings of the Great Standards
 Swinger!: A Jazz Girl's Adventures from Hollywood to Harlem

References

External links
Audio Interview with Joe Zupa

1957 births
American jazz pianists
Living people
People from Greater Los Angeles
Women jazz pianists
People from Sag Harbor, New York
20th-century American pianists
20th-century American women pianists
21st-century American pianists
21st-century American women pianists
People from Lynwood, California
Musicians from Los Angeles County, California
Jazz musicians from California
Jazz musicians from New York (state)